Rachel T. Pinker is a professor of meteorology at the University of Maryland, College Park, where she has worked since 1976.

Education
Pinker received her M.S. degree from Hebrew University in 1965 and her PhD from the University of Maryland, College Park in 1976.

Research
Pinker is known for her research into global dimming and global brightening. She has said that the Earth seems to be getting brighter, and that this may be because of a combination of a clearer sky and fewer clouds.

References

External links

American meteorologists
University of Maryland, College Park faculty
Living people
Hebrew University of Jerusalem alumni
Women meteorologists
University of Maryland, College Park alumni
Year of birth missing (living people)